Jack the Dog is a 2001 American comedy-drama film, written and directed by Bobby Roth and starring Néstor Carbonell, Barbara Williams, Barry Newman, and Anthony LaPaglia. The film premiered at the Sundance Film Festival on January 22, 2001, and was released on DVD in the United States by Rivercoast Films on August 12, 2008. A sequel, Manhood, was released in 2003.

Plot
Serial womanizer Jack (Néstor Carbonell) settles down with Faith (Barbara Williams), but when the marriage falls apart due to Jack's desire for women, he has to share custody of their son, Sam (Andrew J. Ferchland). Living with Sam makes Jack slowly change his thinking and way of life.

Cast
 Néstor Carbonell as Jack The Dog
 Barbara Williams as Faith
 Andrew J. Ferchland as Sam
 Barry Newman as Simon
 Anthony LaPaglia as Jack's Attorney
 Travis Fine as Buddy
 Peter Coyote as Alfred Stieglitz
 Thomas Gibson as Faith's Attorney
 Jürgen Prochnow as Klaus
 Lauren Tom as Angel
 Navi Rawat as Ruby
 Grey DeLisle as Estella
 Gia Carides as Georgia
 Gabe Kaplan as Richie
 Tracey Walter as The Mortician

Release
The film premiered at the Sundance Film Festival on January 22, 2001. Rivercoast Films distributed the film through home media in the United States on August 12, 2008.

Reception
Jack the Dog received a mixed to negative response from film critics, and gained a lukewarm reception during its premiere at the Sundance Film Festival. Todd McCarthy of Variety wrote: "Tale, which lurches along with little sense of pacing or time elapsed, has plenty of niggling problems," and added: "Performances, from the handsome Carbonell to those of Williams as the rhinoceros-hided wife and the many actresses in for literally quickies, are energetic but no more illuminating than the dialogue as to the inner life of their characters."

References

External links
 
 

2001 films
2001 comedy-drama films
American comedy-drama films
Films directed by Bobby Roth
Films shot in Los Angeles
Films scored by Christopher Franke
2001 comedy films
2001 drama films
2000s English-language films
2000s American films
English-language comedy-drama films